Mr. Idol is a 2011 South Korean film written and directed by Ra Hee-chan. Ra called it, "a movie that captures young people's dreams through music."

Ji Hyun-woo, Jay Park, Jang Seo-won and Randy Kim play four young men who come from different walks of life to form an idol band, united by their love of music. Though musically talented, they are far from mass-produced pop material, and the movie portrays their rigorous training process under a producer (Park Ye-jin). But a powerful figure in the music industry (Kim Su-ro) tries to interfere with their rise to superstardom.

Plot
Oh Goo-joo was once a famous producer, but she left the music industry after one of her idol group members died in an accident. One day, she encounters Lee Yoo-jin who was kicked out of an agency called Star Music after years of training to become a singer. Goo-joo believes Yoo-jin could be a star and produces an idol group called Mr. Children. Its members include: the leader Yoo-jin who cares only about singing; dancer Ji-oh who is the one and only person possessing an idol-like air in the band; vocalist Hyun who used to run a karaoke; and rapper Ricky who learned Korean through rapping. They go through intense training under Oh Goo-joo.

Soon, the band attracts public attention, and their fans increase exponentially. They become the most famous rookies in K-pop in 2011. But Sa Hee-moon, the Korean music industry tycoon who heads Star Music, regards Mr. Children as a real pain in the neck, and tries everything to make the band break up. Just seven days before the K-pop Festival, Star Music uploads an old video of Yoo-jin in which he shared his disparaging view of K-pop music. The video spreads and rumblings of disbanding are heard. Can Mr. Children survive in this cutthroat music industry and become the idols of the nation?

Cast
Park Ye-jin - Oh Goo-joo 	
Ji Hyun-woo - Lee Yoo-jin 
Kim Su-ro - Sa Hee-moon 
Im Won-hee - Park Sang-sik 
Jay Park - Ji-oh
Jang Seo-won - Hyun-yi 
Randy Kim - Ricky
Ko Chang-seok - Han Jong-tak
Jang Young-nam - Lee Mi-ri
Joo Jin-mo - Yoo-jin's father
Lee Seung-ha - Soo-hyun
Ahn Seo-hyun - Han Eun-seo
Lee Jae-yong  - Director Hwang
Lee Cheol-min - chief guide
Lee Young-yi - Ricky's mother
Goo Seung-hyun - Han Eun-gi
Lee Sang-hoon - Rebel Without a Cause bassist
Chun Sung-hoon - Rebel Without a Cause drummer
Kim Min-sang - Rebel Without a Cause guitarist
Park Ji-yeon - Hyun-yi's wife
Nam Sang-ran - tarot cafe owner
Han Ye-rin - bad high school student 2
Lee Jin-hee - Reporter Lee
Park Yoon-ho - Reporter Park
Park Chul-min - broadcast station chief producer (cameo)
Nam Gyu-ri - Mi-oh (cameo) 
Lee Hyun-jin - Kim Ji-hoon
U-KISS - Wonder Boys (cameo)
Lee Han-wi - Hong Gil-dong (cameo)
Bang Yong-guk - himself (cameo)
Kim Him-chan - himself (cameo)
Brave Girls - themselves (cameo)
Chocolat - themselves (cameo)

References

External links
 https://web.archive.org/web/20130602115838/http://idol2011.kr/
 
 
 
 
 

South Korean drama films
2011 films
2010s South Korean films